Beaumont Hotham, 3rd Baron Hotham (9 August 1794 – 12 December 1870), was a British soldier, peer and long-standing Conservative Member of Parliament.

Biography
Hotham was the son of Lieutenant-Colonel Beaumont Hotham of South Dalton, East Riding of Yorkshire and Philadelphia Dyke. His father died when he was five years old. He was educated at Westminster School.

He joined the army as an Ensign in the Coldstream Guards in 1810, and was promoted to captain in 1813, major in 1819, lieut.-colonel in 1825; colonel in 1838, major-general in 1851, lieut.-general in 1858 and full general in 1865. He fought in the Peninsular campaign of 1812–1814, including the Battle of Salamanca and the Battle of Vitoria and was at the Battle of Waterloo in 1815.

In 1814 he succeeded his grandfather as third Baron Hotham, but as this was an Irish peerage it did not entitle him to a seat in the House of Lords. He was instead elected to the House of Commons for Leominster in 1820, a seat he held, with a brief exception for a few months in 1831, until 1841, and then represented the East Riding of Yorkshire between 1841 and 1868. By the time he retired from the House of Commons, he was one of the longest-serving Members of Parliament.

In 1771 he rebuilt at his own expense the Parish Church of South Dalton near the family seat of Dalton Hall.

Lord Hotham died in December 1870, aged 76, and was buried in his church at South Dalton. He never married and was succeeded in his titles and estates by his nephew Charles.

References

 
Kidd, Charles, Williamson, David (editors). Debrett's Peerage and Baronetage (1990 edition). New York: St Martin's Press, 1990,

External links 
 

1794 births
1870 deaths
Barons in the Peerage of Ireland
Members of the Parliament of the United Kingdom for English constituencies
British Army generals
British Army personnel of the Napoleonic Wars
UK MPs 1820–1826
UK MPs 1826–1830
UK MPs 1830–1831
UK MPs 1831–1832
UK MPs 1832–1835
UK MPs 1835–1837
UK MPs 1837–1841
UK MPs 1841–1847
UK MPs 1847–1852
UK MPs 1852–1857
UK MPs 1857–1859
UK MPs 1859–1865
UK MPs 1865–1868
UK MPs who inherited peerages